Rue du Cloître-Saint-Benoît was a now-disappeared street in the Sorbonne district of Paris, demolished to build the present rue des Écoles. It was named after the cloister of the église Saint-Benoît-le-Bétourné and just before the French Revolution it fell within that church's parish. It was made part of the Chalier sector during the Revolution - that sector was renamed the Sorbonne district when the original 11th arrondissement of Paris was formed in 1795.

It began at rue des Mathurins-Saint-Jacques (now rue Du Sommerard) and ended at passage Saint-Benoît-Saint-Jacques. Its house numbers were black and the last numbers were 23 and 26.

History 

In a judicial act of 1243 it was known as rue André Machel after its owner. It was later renamed rue de l'Encloître Saint-Benoist then rue du Cloître Saint-Benoît since it served église Saint-Benoît-le-Bétourné. Around 1280-1300 it was mentioned in Le Dit des rues de Paris by Guillot de Paris as en Cloistre Saint-Beneoit le bestourné.

A decree of 1855 prescribed the construction of rue des Écoles, including the demolition of rue du Cloître-Saint-Benoît. Around 1875 all that was left of the street was a junction between rue Du Sommerard and Rue des Écoles, now totally disappeared. Numbers 1, 3, 5 and 7 on place Paul-Painlevé were built on the site of the north part of the street and the main auditorium of the Sorbonne occupies part of its south side.

References

Streets in the 5th arrondissement of Paris